Easterby is a surname. Notable people with the surname include:

Guy Easterby (born 1971), Irish rugby union player
Jack Easterby (born 1982 or 1983), American football executive
Mick Easterby (born 1931), British racehorse trainer
Peter Easterby (born 1929), British racehorse trainer
Simon Easterby (born 1975), Irish rugby union player
Tim Easterby (born 1961), British racehorse trainer